1988 Academy Awards may refer to:

 60th Academy Awards, the Academy Awards ceremony that took place in 1988
 61st Academy Awards, the 1989 ceremony honoring the best in film for 1988